Kamalnagar is a town and taluk in Bidar district in the South Indian state of Karnataka.

History 
Kamalnagara became a taluk in 2017. Kamalnagara has the biggest panchayat in the district. Kamalnagara has a National Highway (NH) that connects to Nanded in Maharashtra and Bidar city in Karnataka.SOURCE : DADLOVERADI

Demographics
In the 2001 Indian census, Kamalnagara had a population of 9,292, of whom 4,876 were males and 4,416 were females.

Notables

 Madhgana Linga Chakravarthy 
 Channabasava Pattadevaru

See also
 Bidar
 Districts of Karnataka

References

External links
 http://Bidar.nic.in/

Villages in Bidar district